John E. Mann is a New Hampshire politician.

Education
Mann graduated from Brookline High School. Mann earned a A.B. from Harvard College in 1961.

Military career
Mann served in the United States Navy from 1961 to 1965.

Political career
On November 6, 2012, Mann was elected to the New Hampshire House of Representatives where he represents the Cheshire 2 district. Mann assumed office on December 5, 2012. Mann is a Democrat.

Personal life
Mann resides in Alstead, New Hampshire. Mann is married and has three children.

References

Living people
People from Alstead, New Hampshire
Brookline High School alumni
Harvard College alumni
Democratic Party members of the New Hampshire House of Representatives
21st-century American politicians
Year of birth missing (living people)